I Also Want to Die in New Orleans is the tenth studio album by American band Sun Kil Moon. It was released in March 2019 under Caldo Verde Records.

The album's title was originally set to be titled Mark Kozelek with Donny McCaslin and Jim White, but after seeing a promotional poster for the 2018 $uicideboy$ album I Want to Die in New Orleans, Kozelek changed the album's title as a response to the hip-hop duo. A CD release of I Also Want to Die in New Orleans was made available on April 12, 2019.

Track listing

References 

2019 albums
Sun Kil Moon albums
Caldo Verde Records albums